Isabelle Thomas (born 26 November 1961) is a French politician. She was a Member of the European Parliament, serving in the eighth term (2014–2019). Previously a member of the Socialist Party, she has been a member of the Génération.s political party since 2017.

Thomas sat on the European Parliament's budgets and fisheries committees.

References 

1961 births
Living people
People from Le Blanc-Mesnil
MEPs for France 2014–2019